The 1936 Saint Mary's Gaels football team was an American football team that represented Saint Mary's College of California during the 1936 college football season. In their 16th season under head coach Slip Madigan, the Gaels compiled a 6–3–1 record and outscored their opponents by a combined total of 140 to 80.

Jerry Dennerlein starred at left tackle for the team. He later played in the National Football League.

Schedule

References

Saint Mary's
Saint Mary's Gaels football seasons
Saint Mary's Gaels football